Carmenta giliae is a moth of the family Sesiidae. It was described by Henry Edwards in 1881, and is found from western Alberta to north-western British Columbia, south to Arizona and New Mexico. The habitat consists of mid-to-high elevation montane meadows.

The wingspan is about 25 mm.

The larvae bore in the roots of wild Geranium species.

References

External links
"640143.00 – 2599 – Carmenta giliae – (Edwards, 1881)". Moth Photographers Group. Mississippi State University.

Sesiidae
Moths described in 1881